Diviš of Talmberk (died 1415) was a Bohemian noble and lord of Talmberk.

Biography
The castle was soon after besieged by Havel Medek of Valdek, who conquered Talmberk and captured Diviš. Diviš was imprisoned for seven years before the provincial courts declared Havel's seizure illegal, and Diviš was able to ransom himself and reclaim the castle. In 1401, he moved to Prague as burgrave of Prague Castle. Diviš died sometime in 1415. His son, Oldřich of Talmberk, succeeded him as Lord of Talmberk.

Some sources conflate Diviš of Talmberk (died 1415) with Diviš from Talmberk and Miličín (1352 – 1413). The latter served as burgrave in the service of the Rosenberg family, whereas Diviš from Talmberk was in the service of Wenceslaus IV. These were likely two different people.

In popular culture
Sir Divish of Talmberg, a character in the 2018 video game Kingdom Come: Deliverance, is based on Diviš. His sons Oldřich, Vilém, and Mikuláš are also referenced in game.

References

1415 deaths
Medieval Bohemian nobility
15th-century Bohemian people
Date of birth unknown